"Right Hand" is a song by Canadian rapper Drake. It was released as a single digitally on July 31, 2015. Drake posted the song along with "Charged Up" and "Hotline Bling" on his blog. It was produced by Vinylz, Frank Dukes, Velous and Kaan Gunesberk.

Personnel 
Adapted from TIDAL.

 Frank Dukes – production, songwriting
 Vinylz – production, songwriting
 Drake – songwriting, vocals
 Kaan Gunesberk – songwriting, backing vocals
 Velous – songwriting

Charts

Commercial performance
In the United States, "Right Hand" sold 27,000 copies in its first week at digital retailers, spurring a debut at number 29 on the Hot R&B/Hip-Hop Songs chart dated August 22, 2015. Over a month later, a strong surge in digital download sales led to its debut at number 66 on the Billboard Hot 100 dated October 2, 2015; it sold 31,000 copies that week, earning its best sales frame up to that point. It has since peaked at number 58. As of October 2015, the song has sold 230,000 copies in the United States.

Weekly charts

Certifications and sales

Release history

References

2015 singles
2015 songs
Drake (musician) songs
Cash Money Records singles
Republic Records singles
Songs written by Drake (musician)
Songs written by Vinylz
Song recordings produced by Frank Dukes